Pål Enger (born 26 March 1967) is a Norwegian former footballer who is best known for stealing the paintings The Scream and Love and Pain by Edvard Munch. During his football career, he played for Vålerenga Fotball.

References

External links
 

1967 births
Norwegian footballers
Art thieves
Living people
Vålerenga Fotball players
Association football midfielders
People from Oslo